Dorcus tenuihirsutus is a beetle species of the family Lucanidae described from Korea in 2010 by Sang Il Kim and Jin-Ill Kim.

References
 ;  2010: Review of family Lucanidae (Insecta: Coleoptera) in Korea with the description of one new species. Entomological Research, 40: 55–81.  

Lucaninae
Beetles of Asia
Insects of Korea
Beetles described in 2010